Alpino was a frigate operated by the Italian Navy during the Cold War.

Design
The  was designed by CNR in Riva Trigoso and named after types of soldiers and specifically after two World War II s.  The design was authorised in the 1959/1960 Italian naval programme but was radically redesigned in 1962. Circe was laid down as the lead ship in 1963 but was renamed Alpino in June 1965 prior to being launched in 1967.

As originally designed, Alpino was to have armament based on the preceding . Optimised for anti-submarine warfare, the vessels were designed around a hangar for an Agusta-Bell AB.204 helicopter, complemented by a single-barrel  Menon mortar mounted forward. An early drawing shows the hangar straddled by a pair of  guns with a single  gun mounted fore and aft to provide anti-aircraft defence. By 1962, the efficacy of the 40 mm was in doubt and the design was redrawn with three 76 mm guns, but this was deemed insufficient.  At launch, the vessel had no less than six single mounts.

The propulsion system uses a combined diesel and gas (CODAG) system first trialled on the destroyer . The system allied two diesels and one gas turbine per shaft with a hydraulic coupling to enable the vessel to either run on diesel power alone, at low speed, or diesels, at high speed, and gas turbines simultaneously.

Service
Commissioned on 14 January 1968, Alpino quickly made a mark as a pioneer of sharply raked bows, the first frigates so equipped in Italian Navy service, as well as gas turbines and variable depth sonar. Between 14 January and 6 June 1973, the ship undertook the longest continuous voyage in the Italian Navy, covering  and travelling as far as the Labrador Sea, for which it was awarded a symbolic Blue Nose.

Alpino acted as the trial ship for the experimental SPQ-5A Sarchiapone radar between 1973 and 1987.

A SLQ-A ECM system was also added during the 1970s. This was subsequently upgraded to SLQ-D. Consideration was also given to installing the Sea Wolf surface-to-air missile system to improve anti-aircraft capability.

The ship was further upgraded during a refit that ended in June 1985. Hull-mounted sonar was fitted and the variable depth sonar rendered inoperable.

Mine warfare flagship
Between 14 April 1996 and 31 January 1997, Alpino was converted into the flagship for minewarfare, a mine countermeasures support ship, a combat diver support ship and signals intelligence ship with the new penant number A5384. The vessel acted in the flagship role to the Gaeta-class minehunters Crotone and Chioggia from 18 March to 22 June 2002 during a NATO training exercise in Northern Europe. From 13 May 2004, Alpino commanded MCMFORSOUTH while on exercise in the Black Sea.

Thirty-eight years after being originally commissioned, the ship was decommissioned on 31 March 2006.

References

External links
 Alpino (F 580 - A 5384) Marina Militare website

1967 ships
Alpino-class frigates
Ships built in Italy
Frigates of the Cold War